The Manipur Legislative Assembly is the unicameral state legislature of Manipur state in India.

The seat of the Legislative Assembly is at Imphal, the capital of the state. It is housed in the Capital Complex in the Thangmeiband locality of Imphal city. The term of the Legislative Assembly is five years, unless dissolved earlier. Presently, it comprises 60 members who are directly elected from single-seat constituencies.

List of Constituencies

References 

 
Manipur
Constituencies